The Big League World Series (BLWS) Southeast and Southwest regions were two of five United States regions that sent teams to the Big League World Series. The region's participation in the BLWS dated back to 1968 when it was known as the South Region. The Big League division of Little League Baseball was discontinued after the 2016 World baseball Series.

South Region States
In 2002 the region was split in half.

Southeast

 Georgia

Southwest

 (East)
 (West)

Region Champions

South Region Champions

Results by State

Southeast Region Champions

Southwest Region Champions

Results by State

See also
South Region in other Little League divisions
Little League – South 1957-2000
Little League – Southeast
Little League – Southwest
Intermediate League
Junior League
Senior League

References

Big League World Series
South
Sports in the Southern United States